The 1949 Ostzonenmeisterschaft Final decided the winner of the 1949 Ostzonenmeisterschaft, the 2nd edition of the Ostzonenmeisterschaft, a knockout football cup competition to decide the champions of the Soviet occupation zone.

The match was played on 26 June 1949 at the Stadion im Ostragehege in Dresden. Union Halle won the match 4–1 against Fortuna Erfurt for their 1st title.

Route to the final
The Ostzonenmeisterschaft was a ten team single-elimination knockout cup competition. There were a total of three rounds leading up to the final. Four teams entered the qualifying round, with the two winners advancing to the quarter-finals, where they were joined by six additional clubs who were given a bye. For all matches, the winner after 90 minutes advances. If still tied, extra time was used to determine the winner.

Match

Details

References

Turbine Halle matches
FC Rot-Weiß Erfurt matches
1948–49 in German football
Association football matches in Germany